Rubus largus is a rare North American species of brambles in the rose family. It has been found in the State of New Jersey in the northeastern United States.

The genetics of Rubus is extremely complex, so that it is difficult to decide on which groups should be recognized as species. There are many rare species with limited ranges such as this. Further study is suggested to clarify the taxonomy.

References

largus
Plants described in 1941
Flora of New Jersey
Flora without expected TNC conservation status